Maria Shirinkina (Russian: Мария Ширинкина, born 18 April 1987) is a first soloist of the Mariinsky Ballet and a guest principal dancer of the Bayerisches Staatsballett.

Biography
Maria Shirinkina was born in Perm and studied at the Perm Ballet School under Ninel Silvanovich. She graduated in 2006 and, upon her graduation, she joined the Mariinsky Ballet. She was promoted to second soloist in 2011 following her début as Juliet in Leonid Lavrovsky's Romeo and Juliet. She has toured across the world with the Mariinsky Ballet to places such as the United States, Europe, China and Japan.

Her repertoire includes the Sylph in La Sylphide, Giselle, Princess Aurora in The Sleeping Beauty, Cinderella, Raymonda and leading roles in Chopiniana, Jewels, Symphony in C and the Tschaikovsky Pas de Deux. In June 2016, she made her début as Nikiya in a gala performance of the "Kingdom of the Shades" scene from La Bayadère held at the Ural Opera in Yekaterinburg.

In September 2016, Shirinkina and her husband took a one-year sabbatical and joined the Bayerische Staatsballett in Munich, Germany as principals with the invitation of Igor Zelensky, the theater's new artistic director. They returned to Saint Petersburg in 2017, but continue to perform as guest principals in Munich. During her season in Munich, Shirinkina made her débuts as Phrygia in Yuri Grigorovich's Spartacus, Lise in Frederick Ashton's La fille mal gardée and Alice in Christopher Wheeldon's Alice's Adventures in Wonderland, as well as her full-length début as Nikiya in Patrice Bart's production of La Bayadère and Juliet in Cranko's Romeo and Juliet.

In 2019, Shirinkina was promoted to First Soloist with the Mariinsky Ballet.

Personal life

Shirinkina is married to fellow Russian ballet dancer Vladimir Shklyarov. In February 2015, Shirinkina gave birth to their first child, son Alexey, two days before his father's 30th birthday. In July 2021, the couple's second child, daughter Alexandra was born.

Repertoire
Giselle in Giselle
The Sylph in La Sylphide
Princess Aurora in The Sleeping Beauty
Princess Masha in Vainonen's The Nutcracker
Nikiya in La Bayadère
Raymonda in Raymonda
Gulnare in Le Corsaire
Mazurka and Pas de deux in Chopiniana
The Young Girl in Le Spectre de la rose
Juliet in Lavrovsky's and Cranko's Romeo and Juliet
Syuimbike in Leonid Yakobson's Shurale
Maria in  Zakharov's The Fountain of Bakhchisarai
The Tsar Maiden in Alexei Ratmansky's The Little Humpbacked Horse
Cinderella in Alexei Ratmansky's Cinderella
Phrygia in Yuri Grigorovich's Spartacus
Princess Shyrin in Yuri Grigorovich's The Legend of Love
Parasha in Yuri Smekalov's The Bronze Horseman
Lucille Grahn in Anton Dolin's Pas de Quatre
Lise in Frederick Ashton's La fille mal gardée
Alice in Christopher Wheeldon's Alice's Adventures in Wonderland
Emeralds and Rubies in Jewels
Divertissement Pas de deux in George Balanchine's A Midsummer Night's Dream
First Movement in Symphony in C
Tschaikovsky Pas de Deux
Helena in John Neumeier's A Midsummer Night's Dream
Columbine in Carnaval

References

External links

1987 births
Living people
People from Perm, Russia
Perm State Choreographic College alumni
Russian ballerinas
Mariinsky Ballet dancers
21st-century Russian ballet dancers